Hans Kammler (26 August 1901 – 1945 [assumed]) was an SS-Obergruppenführer responsible for Nazi civil engineering projects and its top secret V-weapons program. He oversaw the construction of various Nazi concentration camps before being put in charge of the V-2 rocket and Emergency Fighter Programs towards the end of World War II. Kammler disappeared in May 1945, during the final days of the war. There has been much conjecture regarding his fate.

Early life
Kammler was born in Stettin, German Empire (now Szczecin, Poland). In 1919, after volunteering for army service, he served in the Rossbach Freikorps. From 1919 to 1923, he studied civil engineering at the Technische Hochschule der Freien Stadt Danzig and Munich and was awarded his doctorate of engineering (Dr. Ing.) in November 1932, following some years of practical work in local building administration.

Nazi party
In 1931, Kammler joined the Nazi Party (NSDAP), where he held a variety of administrative positions after the Nazi government came to power in 1933. Initially he was head of the Aviation Ministry's building department. He joined the SS on 20 May 1933. In 1934, he was serving the Reich's Ministry as the leader of the Reichsbund der Kleingärtner und Kleinsiedler (Reich's federation of allotment gardeners and small home owners). 

Committed to the Nazi cause, engineers like Kammler "saw no contradiction between notions of blood and soil and the methods of modern organization and technology." Historian Michael Thad Allen argues that Kammler wanted to place "the best means of modern organization" at the Nazis' disposal since he believed that National Socialism was a "necessary catalyst" for modern construction. For Kammler, the concepts of "modern technology, organization, and ideologies of German supremacy" were all interwoven.

Concentration camps
Before joining Oswald Pohl's organization at the SS Main Economic and Administrative Office (WVHA), Kammler had already been advising the SS Race and Settlement Office as a consultant. In June 1941, he joined the Waffen-SS. Due to Himmler's desire to increase the pace and scale of SS construction activities Kammler was released as an adviser in the Reichskommissariat for the Reinforcement of Germandom, so his technical and managerial competencies could be exploited. In the person of Kammler, Allen writes, "technological competence and extreme Nazi fanaticism coexisted in the same man." Even Albert Speer—Hitler's chief architect—came to fear Kammler and placed him among "Himmler's most brutal and most ruthless henchmen." Kammler was known to scrutinize the education of his subordinates as well as their ideological commitment to National Socialism, which he factored into their duty assignments and promotions.

Immediately after being assigned to the WVHA, Kammler became Pohl's deputy, where he worked with SS-Gruppenführer Richard Glücks of Office D (Concentration Camps Inspectorate), and was also named Chief of Office C, which designed and constructed all the concentration and extermination camps. On 26 September 1941—just days after the announcement of the plan for Majdanek—Kammler ordered the construction of the largest of the camps at Auschwitz. On December 19, 1941, Kammler updated Himmler about the slow progress at both Auschwitz-Birkenau and Majdanek, remarking that construction was delayed due to the freezing weather, lack of materials, and insufficient manpower. By late March 1942, the systematic mass deportation of Jews to Auschwitz had begun.

Historian Nikolaus Wachsmann states that Kammler "was intimately involved in all the major building projects in Auschwitz." For instance, in his capacity within the WVHA, Kammler oversaw the installation of more efficient cremation facilities at Auschwitz-Birkenau, when the Nazis converted it into an extermination camp. Under Kammler's supervision, new crematoria were planned during August 1942 at Birkenau to facilitate burning up to one-hundred twenty thousand corpses per month.

Secret weapons projects

After the RAF successfully bombed the rocket production facilities at Peenemünde during August 1943, Reich Ministry of Armaments and War Production Albert Speer recommended transferring the V-2 rocket production underground. Hitler immediately agreed with Speer, and the two decided that the SS, with its massive supply of slave labor, was best suited for this task. As the SS construction chief, Kammler was selected to oversee the project—along with representatives Gerhard Degenkolb and Karl Maria Hettlage from Speer's ministry—which began at a huge fuel storage facility in Thuringia under the Mittelwerke GmbH.

By the end of August 1943, Kammler had a sizable detachment of concentration camp inmates from Buchenwald working at the new underground installation, and before the year was out there were so many slave laborers that another facility (Mittelbau-Dora concentration camp) had to be established. The secret weapons projects for which Kammler was given responsibility included manufacturing both the Messerschmitt Me 262 and the V-2, which Kammler—in a construction effort of ruthless brutality and speed—had in production before the end of 1943. The tunnels and weapons were built in horrendous conditions by the slave laborers from Mittelbau-Dora. Research has found that of the 60,000 people that passed through Mittelbau-Dora camp, an estimated 10,000 died producing the V2 alone, which is double the roughly 5,000 killed by the weapon system in Britain and Belgium combined. More than 20,000 died at Mittelbau-Dora in total throughout the camp's existence. Kammler's attitude towards the prisoners was utter indifference, having once exclaimed, "Don't worry about the victims. The work must proceed ahead in the shortest time possible".

Speer made Kammler his representative for "special construction tasks", expecting that Kammler would commit himself to working in harmony with the ministry's main construction committee. But in March 1944 Kammler had Göring appoint him as his delegate for "special buildings" under the fighter aircraft program, which made him one of the war economy's most important managers, and robbed Speer of much of his influence.

Kammler was also involved in an attempt to finish the Blockhaus d'Éperlecques near Saint-Omer, Pas-de-Calais in Northern France. The fortified bunker was to be used as a V-2 launch base but it was abandoned in September 1944 before it was finished.

In March 1944, Himmler convinced Adolf Hitler to put the V-2 project directly under SS control. On 8 August Kammler replaced Walter Dornberger as its director taking command and control of V-2 operations. The first rockets were launched from a site near The Hague against London on 8 September 1944. On 31 January 1945, Hitler named Kammler head of all missile projects, but by this time the lack of explosives was critical and the program was winding down.

In March 1945, Hitler stripped Göring of his powers over aircraft support, maintenance and supply, and transferred these duties to Kammler. This culminated, in the beginning of April, with Kammler being raised to "Fuehrer's general plenipotentiary for jet aircraft".

Arnsberg Forest Massacre

In late March 1945 Kammler ordered the ZV division (in German) (units that operated the V-2 rockets) to execute forced laborers and their families (200 men, women and children) after his car was held up on a crowded road in the Sauerland. Kammler was reported to have felt he was under some "vague threat" so "this riffraff ought to be eliminated". The killings coincided with the evacuation of V2 units due to the Allied advance into Germany.

Disappearance and possible fate
On 1 April 1945, Kammler ordered the evacuation of 500 missile technicians to the Nazis' Alpine Fortress. Since the last V-2 on the western front had been launched in late March, on 5 April Kammler was charged by the Oberkommando der Wehrmacht to command the defense of the Nordhausen area. However, rather than defend the missile construction works, he immediately ordered the destruction of all the "special V-1 equipment" at the Syke storage site.

In the final weeks of the war in Europe, Kammler's movements became sketchy and contradictory. Wernher von Braun said Kammler was in Oberammergau, Bavaria in April 1945.  The Nazi rocket scientist later reported having overheard a discussion between Kammler and his aide-de-camp in which Kammler said he planned to hide in nearby Ettal Abbey. Kammler and his followers then left town, according to von Braun. Further evidence of Kammler's activities is a telegraph from Kammler to Speer, Himmler and Göring on 16 April, informing them of the creation of a "message centre" at Munich and the appointment of a chief representative for the construction of the Messerschmitt Me 262. On 20 April, he reportedly arrived with a group of technicians at Himmler’s Kommandostelle near Salzburg. On 23 April, Kammler sent a radio message to his office manager at Berlin, ordering him to organize the immediate destruction of the "V-1 equipment near Berlin" and then to go to Munich. 

A wartime diary, relating to the surrender of the mountain resort town Garmisch-Partenkirchen to Allied troops, mentions Kammler and his staff. It said that Kammler and his staff of some 600 personnel, with "good quality" cars and trucks arrived in Oberammergau (north of Garmisch-Partenkirchen) on 22 April 1945 but their arrival was badly received by the local authorities who had several arguments with Kammler himself. These conflicts are referenced in the entries for 23 and 25 April. The last reference, implicating only Kammler's "staff", comes on the night of 28 April – an Oberleutnant Burger reports that they had gone on the same night that American forces began entering Oberammergau.

In late April/early May, Kammler was reportedly at the Villa Mendelssohn at Ebensee, site of one of the projects assigned to him. On 4 May, he ordered the immediate transfer of the Ebensee office to Prague.

In a sworn statement on 16 October 1959, Kammler's driver, Kurt Preuk stated that Kammler's date of death was "about 10 May 1945", but that he did not know the cause of death. On 7 September 1965, Heinz Zeuner (a wartime aide of Kammler's), stated that Kammler had died on 7 May 1945 and that his corpse had been observed by Zeuner, Preuk and others. All the eyewitnesses consulted were certain that the cause of death was cyanide poisoning. In their accounts of Kammler's movements Preuk and Zeuner claimed that he left Linderhof near Oberammergau on 28 April 1945 for a tank conference at Salzburg and then went to Ebensee (where tank tracks were manufactured). According to Preuk and Zeuner he then traveled back from Ebensee to visit his wife in the Tyrol region, when he gave her two cyanide tablets. The next day, 5 May, at around 4 am, he is said to have departed Tyrol for Prague.

In a 1969 book Wernher von Braun: Mein Leben für die Raumfahrt, author Bernd Ruland claimed Kammler arrived in Prague by aircraft on 4 May 1945, following which he and 21 SS men defended a bunker against an attack by more than 500 Czech resistance fighters on 9 May. During the attack, one of Kammler's aides-de-camp shot Kammler to prevent his capture. This version can reportedly be traced to Walter Dornberger, who in turn is said to have heard it from eyewitnesses.

Official verdict
On 9 July 1945, Kammler's wife petitioned to have him declared dead as of 9 May 1945. She provided a statement by Kammler's driver, Kurt Preuk, according to which Preuk had personally seen "the corpse of Kammler and been present at his burial" on 9 May 1945. The District Court of Berlin-Charlottenburg ruled on 7 September 1948 that his death was officially established as 9 May 1945.

Both Preuk and Zeuner maintained their version of events when interviewed in the 1990s. Some support for this version of events came from letters written by Ingeborg Alix Prinzessin zu Schaumburg-Lippe, a female member of the SS-Helferinnenkorps to Kammler’s wife in 1951 and 1955. In these, she affirmed that Kammler had said goodbye to her on 7 May 1945 in Prague, stating that the Americans were after him, had made him offers but that he had refused and that they would not "get him alive".

Post-war searches 
US occupation forces conducted various inquiries into Kammler’s whereabouts, beginning with the headquarters of 12th Army ordering a complete inventory of all personnel involved in missile production on 21 May 1945. This resulted in the creation of a file for Kammler, stating that he was possibly in Munich. The CIC noted that he had been seen shortly prior to the arrival of US troops in Oberjoch.

The Combined Intelligence Objectives Sub-Committee (CIOS) in London ordered a search for him in early July 1945. Members of the 12th Army replied that he was last seen on 8 or 9 April in the Harz region. In August, Kammler's name made "List 13" of the UN for Nazi war criminals. Only in 1948 did the CIOS receive the information that Kammler reportedly fled to Prague and had committed suicide. Original blueprints of Kammler’s major projects were later found in the personal property of Samuel Goudsmit, the scientific leader of the Alsos Mission.

A CIC report from April 1946 listed Kammler among SS officers known to be outside Germany and considered to be of special interest to the CIC. In mid-July 1945, the head of the Gmunden CIC office, Major Morrisson interviewed an unnamed German on the issue of a numbered account associated with construction sites for plane and missile production formerly run by the SS. A report published years later, in late 1947 or early 1948, stated that only Kammler and two other persons had access to the account. The report also said that "shortly after the occupation, Hans Kammler appeared at CIC Gmunden and gave a statement on operations at Ebensee". The CIC notes on the interview give no name, but the interviewee must have been one of the three people with access to the account. Aside from Kammler, one was known to have left Austria in May 1945, the other was in a POW camp during July.

In 1949 a report written by one Oskar Packe on Kammler was filed by the US Denazification office in Hesse. The report stated that Kammler had been arrested by US troops on 9 May 1945 at the Messerschmitt works at Oberammergau. However, Kammler and some other senior SS personnel had managed to escape in the direction of Austria or Italy. Packe did not believe the reports about a suicide, as these were contradicted "by the detailed information from the CIC" about arrest and escape. 

Donald W. Richardson (1917–1997) a former OSS special agent involved in the Alsos Mission, claimed to be "the man who brought Kammler to the US". Shortly before he died, Richardson reportedly told his sons about his experience during and after the war, including Operation Paperclip. According to them, Richardson claimed to have supervised Kammler until 1947. Kammler was supposedly "interned at a place of maximum security, with no hope, no mercy and without seeing the light of day until he hanged himself". In 2019, the Woodrow Wilson International Center for Scholars published evidence that Kammler was indeed captured and interviewed by Americans during May 1945 in Germany; however, none of the evidence substantiated his stay and later suicide in the U.S., as Richardson claimed.

See also
Arthur Rudolph
Jakob Sporrenberg
List SS-Obergruppenführer
Wernher von Braun
Walter Dornberger

Notes

References

Sources

 
 
 

 
 
 
 
 
 
 
 
 

 
 
 
 
 
 

 
 
 
 
 

1901 births
20th-century Freikorps personnel
Holocaust perpetrators
SS-Obergruppenführer
People from the Province of Pomerania
Technical University of Munich alumni
German civil engineers
Gdańsk University of Technology alumni
Waffen-SS personnel
Recipients of the Knights Cross of the War Merit Cross
Engineers from Szczecin
V-weapons people
Year of death uncertain
Date of death unknown
Military personnel from Szczecin